The 71st parallel north is a circle of latitude that is 71 degrees north of the Earth's equatorial plane, in the Arctic. It crosses the Atlantic Ocean, Europe, Asia and North America, and passes through some of the southern seas of the Arctic Ocean.

At this latitude the sun is visible for 24 hours, 0 minutes during the summer solstice and Civil Twilight during the winter solstice.

Around the world
Starting at the Prime Meridian and heading eastwards, the parallel 71° north passes through:

{| class="wikitable plainrowheaders"
! scope="col" width="125" | Co-ordinates
! scope="col" | Country, territory or sea
! scope="col" | Notes
|-
| style="background:#b0e0e6;" | 
! scope="row" style="background:#b0e0e6;" | Atlantic Ocean
| style="background:#b0e0e6;" | Norwegian Sea
|-
| 
! scope="row" | 
| Islands of Rolvsøy, Havøya, Måsøy, Magerøya
|-
| style="background:#b0e0e6;" | 
! scope="row" style="background:#b0e0e6;" | Barents Sea
| style="background:#b0e0e6;" |
|-
| 
! scope="row" | 
| Nordkinn Peninsula
|-
| style="background:#b0e0e6;" | 
! scope="row" style="background:#b0e0e6;" | Barents Sea
| style="background:#b0e0e6;" |
|-
| 
! scope="row" | 
| Novaya Zemlya - islands of Mezhdusharskiy and Yuzhny
|-
| style="background:#b0e0e6;" | 
! scope="row" style="background:#b0e0e6;" | Kara Sea
| style="background:#b0e0e6;" |
|-
| 
! scope="row" | 
| Yamal Peninsula
|-
| style="background:#b0e0e6;" | 
! scope="row" style="background:#b0e0e6;" | Gulf of Ob
| style="background:#b0e0e6;" |
|-
| 
! scope="row" | 
| Gydan Peninsula
|-
| style="background:#b0e0e6;" | 
! scope="row" style="background:#b0e0e6;" | Yenisei Gulf
| style="background:#b0e0e6;" |
|-
| 
! scope="row" | 
|
|-
| style="background:#b0e0e6;" | 
! scope="row" style="background:#b0e0e6;" | Laptev Sea
| style="background:#b0e0e6;" | Buor-Khaya Gulf
|-
| 
! scope="row" | 
|Yana-Indigirka Lowland
|-
| style="background:#b0e0e6;" | 
! scope="row" style="background:#b0e0e6;" | East Siberian Sea
| style="background:#b0e0e6;" |
|-
| 
! scope="row" | 
|Kolyma Lowland
|-
| style="background:#b0e0e6;" | 
! scope="row" style="background:#b0e0e6;" | East Siberian Sea
| style="background:#b0e0e6;" |
|-
| 
! scope="row" | 
| Wrangel Island
|-
| style="background:#b0e0e6;" | 
! scope="row" style="background:#b0e0e6;" | Chukchi Sea
| style="background:#b0e0e6;" |
|-
| 
! scope="row" | 
| Alaska - North Slope
|-
| style="background:#b0e0e6;" | 
! scope="row" style="background:#b0e0e6;" | Beaufort Sea
| style="background:#b0e0e6;" |
|-valign="top"
| style="background:#b0e0e6;" | 
! scope="row" style="background:#b0e0e6;" | Amundsen Gulf
| style="background:#b0e0e6;" | Passing just south of Banks Island, Northwest Territories, 
|-valign="top"
| 
! scope="row" | 
| Northwest Territories - Victoria Island Nunavut - Victoria Island
|-
| style="background:#b0e0e6;" | 
! scope="row" style="background:#b0e0e6;" | M'Clintock Channel
| style="background:#b0e0e6;" |
|-
| style="background:#b0e0e6;" | 
! scope="row" style="background:#b0e0e6;" | Larsen Sound
| style="background:#b0e0e6;" |
|-
| 
! scope="row" | 
| Nunavut - Boothia Peninsula
|-
| style="background:#b0e0e6;" | 
! scope="row" style="background:#b0e0e6;" | Gulf of Boothia
| style="background:#b0e0e6;" |
|-
| 
! scope="row" | 
| Nunavut - Baffin Island
|-
| style="background:#b0e0e6;" | 
! scope="row" style="background:#b0e0e6;" | Bernier Bay
| style="background:#b0e0e6;" |
|-
| 
! scope="row" | 
| Nunavut - Baffin Island, Sillem Island and Baffin Island again
|-
| style="background:#b0e0e6;" | 
! scope="row" style="background:#b0e0e6;" | Baffin Bay
| style="background:#b0e0e6;" |
|-
| 
! scope="row" | 
| Uummannaq Fjord
|-
| style="background:#b0e0e6;" | 
! scope="row" style="background:#b0e0e6;" | Hall Bredning 
| style="background:#b0e0e6;" |
|-
| 
! scope="row" | 
| Jameson Land
|-
| style="background:#b0e0e6;" | 
! scope="row" style="background:#b0e0e6;" | Atlantic Ocean
| style="background:#b0e0e6;" | Greenland Sea
|-
| 
! scope="row" | 
| Island of Jan Mayen
|-
| style="background:#b0e0e6;" | 
! scope="row" style="background:#b0e0e6;" | Atlantic Ocean
| style="background:#b0e0e6;" | Norwegian Sea
|}

See also
70th parallel north
72nd parallel north

n71
Geography of the Arctic